Jung Sun-Yong (born March 11, 1971) is a female South Korean judoka.

At the age of 14, she was the youngest judoka ever to represent South Korea in 1985.

Jung won two medals at the 1989 and 1995 World Championships, and also gained a silver medal in the lightweight division at the 1996 Summer Olympics.

Jung won the Asian Championship three consecutive times, the Fukuoka International Female Judo Championship five times, and the Paris Open (Tournoi de Paris) three times.

She retired right after the 1996 Olympics, and currently serves as a teacher in elementary school.

External links
Database Olympics

1971 births
Judoka at the 1992 Summer Olympics
Judoka at the 1996 Summer Olympics
Olympic judoka of South Korea
Olympic silver medalists for South Korea
Living people
Olympic medalists in judo
Asian Games medalists in judo
Judoka at the 1994 Asian Games
South Korean female judoka
Medalists at the 1996 Summer Olympics
Asian Games gold medalists for South Korea
Medalists at the 1994 Asian Games
Universiade medalists in judo
Goodwill Games medalists in judo
Universiade bronze medalists for South Korea
Competitors at the 1990 Goodwill Games
20th-century South Korean women